"Warm Night" is a song by Swedish band The Concretes from their debut album The Concretes. Its original Scandinavian release as a single took place in 2003. It was re-released in the United Kingdom on December 13, 2004.

Track listings

2003 Scandinavian release
CD LFCD008
"Warm Night"
"Final Goal"

2004 UK release
7" LFD7015, CD LFCD015
"Warm Night" - 3:37
"Seems Fine Shuffle" - 2:47
"Lady December" - 4:39
"The Warrior" - 3:31

2003 singles
2004 singles
2003 songs